Windfall Run is a tributary of Baker Run in Wyoming County, Pennsylvania, in the United States. The stream itself is classified as Class A Wild Trout Waters by the Pennsylvania Fish and Boat Commission. The surficial geology in its vicinity includes Wisconsinan Till and bedrock.

Course
Windfall Run begins in a wetland on a plateau in Noxen Township. It flows north-northeast for several tenths of a mile and enters a deep valley before turning east-southeast. The stream flows in this direction for more than a mile before reaching its confluence with Baker Run.

Hydrology

Geography and geology

The surficial geology along Windfall Run in the Dutch Mountain quadrangle, where most of the stream is situated, consists of a till known as Wisconsinan Till. However, bedrock consisting of sandstone and shale occurs on the sides of the stream's valley.

For much of its length, Noxen Township flows through a deep valley cut into a plateau.

Watershed
The mouth of the stream is in the United States Geological Survey quadrangle of Noxen. However, its source is in the quadrangle of Dutch Mountain.

The entire length of Windfall Run is on public land that is open to access. The stream is situated entirely within Pennsylvania State Game Lands Number 57.

History
Windfall Run was entered into the Geographic Names Information System on August 2, 1979. Its identifier in the Geographic Names Information System is 1199800.

Biology
Wild trout naturally reproduce in Windfall Run from its headwaters downstream to its mouth. The stream is designated by the Pennsylvania Fish and Boat Commission as Class A Wild Trout Waters for brook trout from its headwaters downstream to its mouth.

See also
List of rivers of Pennsylvania
List of tributaries of Bowman Creek

References

External links
Image of Windfall Run

Rivers of Wyoming County, Pennsylvania
Tributaries of Bowman Creek
Rivers of Pennsylvania